was a feudal domain under the Tokugawa shogunate of Edo period Japan, located in Tanba Province in what is now the west-central portion of modern-day Kyoto Prefecture. It was centered initially around Fukuchiyama Castle in what is now the city of Fukuchiyama, Kyoto.

History
In 1579, Oda Nobunaga granted Tanba Province in its entirety to Akechi Mitsuhide. Mitsuhide entrusted the Fukuchiyama region to his brother-in-law Akechi Hidemitsu. When Mitsuhide rebelled against Nobunaga in the Honnō-ji Incident in 1591, Hidemitsu served in the vanguard of the Akechi armies, and after Mitsuhide's defeat at the Battle of Yamazaki, he famously crossed Lake Biwa to Sakamoto Castle, where he committed suicide with Mitsuhide's widow and children. Afterwards, Toyotomi Hideyoshi awarded the Fukuchiyama area to his generals Sugihara Ieji and Onogi Shigeuji, both of whom were subsequently killed in 1600 at the Siege of Tanabe fighting for the Western Army. Following his victory at the Battle of Sekigahara, Tokugawa Ieyasu granted Fukuchiyama to Arima Toyouji, who was transferred from Yokosuka in Mikawa Province to become daimyō of the new 60,000 koku Fukuchiyama Domain under the Tokugawa Shogunate. When his father died in 1602, he inherited an additional 20,000 koku, raising the domain to a kokudaka of 80,000 koku. He constructed Fukuchiyama Castle and the castle town, conducted a land survey, and set the foundations for the domain. However, after his transfer to Kurume Domain in 1620, the domain passed through a number of clans in rapid succession. In August 1621, Okabe Nagamori was transferred from Tanba-Kameyama Domain, but was transferred to Ogaki Domain in Mino Province in September 1624. He was replaced by Inaba Norimichi from Nakajima Domain in Settsu Province, but due to bad government and paranoia against Kyōgoku Takahiro of Miyazu Domain in neighboring Tango Province, he raised an army of 1500 troops and planned to invade. The shogunate quickly intervened and Inaba, cornered in Fukuchiyama Castle, shot himself in the head with a gun in 1648. In 1649, Matsudaira Tadafusa was transferred from Kariya Domain in Mikawa Province. He was noted for performing a new land survey, which continued to be used into the Meiji period. He was transferred to Shimabara Domain in 1669, and was replaced by Kutsuki Tanemasa from Tsuchiura Domain in Hitachi Province. The Kutsuki clan would continue to rule Fukuchiyama until the Meiji restoration, although the domain's finances were alway precarious, especially after the Kyōhō famine of 1732-1733. Peasant uprisings were frequent occurrences. Among the successive daimyō, Kutsuki Nobutsuna and Kutsuki Masatsuna were noted as literati, and promoted rangaku studies. the 9th daimyō, Kutsuki Tomotsuna, promoted fiscal and financial reforms. During the Bakumatsu period, the final daimyō, Kutsuki Moritsuna, surrendered to imperial forces after the defeat of the pro-Tokugawa army at the Battle of Toba-Fushimi. Following the abolition of the han system in 1871, he relocated to Tokyo, and devoted the remainder of his life to providing relief measures for his former samurai retainers. His son, Viscount Kutsuki Tsunasada, was a major general in the Imperial Japanese Army, politician, and noted researcher of gunpowder.

Fukuchiyama Domain became "Fukuchiyama Prefecture" in 1871, and was merged into "Toyooka Prefecture". It was transferred to Kyoto Prefecture in 1876.

Holdings at the end of the Edo period
As with most domains in the han system, Fukuchiyama Domain consisted of several discontinuous territories calculated to provide the assigned kokudaka, based on periodic cadastral surveys and projected agricultural yields. 

Tanba Province 
62 villages in Amata District
Ōmi Province
 4 villages in Takashima District
10 villages in Soma District

List of daimyō 

{| class=wikitable
! #||Name || Tenure || Courtesy title || Court Rank || kokudaka
|-
|colspan=6|  Arima clan, 1600-1620 (tozama)
|-
||1||||1600 – 1620||Genba-no-kami (玄蕃頭); Jijū (侍従)|| Junior 4th Rank, Lower Grade (従四位下)||60,000 -> 80,000 koku
|-
|colspan=6|  tenryō　1620-1621
|-
|colspan=6|  Okabe clan, 1621-1624 (fudai)
|-
||1||||1621 – 1624||Naizen-no-kami (内膳正)|| Junior 5th Rank, Lower Grade (従五位下)||50,000 koku
|-
|colspan=6|  Inaba clan, 1624-1648 (tozama)
|-
||1||||1624 – 1648||Awaji-no-kami (淡路守)|| Junior 5th Rank, Lower Grade (従五位下)||45,700 koku
|-
|colspan=6|  tenryō　1648-1649
|-
|colspan=6|  Fukōzu Matsudaira clan, 1649-1669 (fudai)
|-
||1||||1649 – 1669||Tomoro-no-kami (主殿頭 )|| Junior 5th Rank, Lower Grade (従五位下)||45,900 koku
|-
|colspan=6|  Kutsuki clan, 1669-1871 (fudai)
|-
||1||||1669 – 1708||Iyo-no-kami (伊予守 )|| Junior 5th Rank, Lower Grade (従五位下)||32,000 koku
|-
||2||||1708 – 1721||Minbu-taifu (民部大輔 )|| Junior 5th Rank, Lower Grade (従五位下)||32,000 koku
|-
||3||||1721 – 1726||Iyo-no-kami (伊予守 )|| Junior 5th Rank, Lower Grade (従五位下)||32,000 koku
|-
|4||||1726 – 1728||Tosa-no-kami (土佐守)|| Junior 5th Rank, Lower Grade (従五位下)||32,000 koku
|-
|5||||1728 – 1770||Tosa-no-kami (土佐守)|| Junior 5th Rank, Lower Grade (従五位下)||32,000 koku
|-
|6||||1770 – 1780||Ōi-no-kami (大炊頭)|| Junior 5th Rank, Lower Grade (従五位下)||32,000 koku
|-
|7||||1780 – 1787||Iyo-no-kami (伊予守)|| Junior 5th Rank, Lower Grade (従五位下)||32,000 koku
|-
|8||||1787 – 1800||Ōmi-no-kami (近江守)|| Junior 5th Rank, Lower Grade (従五位下)||32,000 koku
|-
|9||||1800 – 1802||Tosa-no-kami (土佐守)|| Junior 5th Rank, Lower Grade (従五位下)||32,000 koku
|-
|10||||1803 – 1821||Tosa-no-kami (土佐守)|| Junior 5th Rank, Lower Grade (従五位下)||32,000 koku
|-
|11||||1821 – 1836||Oki-no-kami (隠岐守)|| Junior 5th Rank, Lower Grade (従五位下)||32,000 koku
|-
|12||||1836 – 1867||Ōmi-no-kami (近江守)|| Junior 5th Rank, Lower Grade (従五位下)||32,000 koku
|-
|13||||1867 – 1871||Ōmi-no-kami (近江守)|| Junior 5th Rank, Lower Grade (従五位下)||32,000 koku
|-
|-
|}

See also 
 List of Han
 Abolition of the han system

Further reading
 Bolitho, Harold. (1974). Treasures Among Men: The Fudai Daimyo in Tokugawa Japan. New Haven: Yale University Press.  ;  OCLC 185685588

References

Domains of Japan
1600 establishments in Japan
States and territories established in 1600
1871 disestablishments in Japan
States and territories disestablished in 1871
Tanba Province
History of Kyoto Prefecture